Nizhnekhozyatovo (Tübänge Xäjät) is a rural locality (a village) in Chishminsky Selsoviet, Chishminsky District, Bashkortostan, Russia. The population was 246 as of 2010. There are 4 streets.

Geography 
Nizhnekhozyatovo is located 15 km southwest of Chishmy (the district's administrative centre) by road. Srednekhozyatovo is the nearest rural locality.

References 

Rural localities in Chishminsky District